Saba Lobjanidze (born 18 December 1994) is a Georgian professional footballer who plays for Süper Lig club Hatayspor.

Club career
Born in Tbilisi, Lobzhanidze started playing for Norchi Dinamoeli at the age of 10. Later he joined Dinamo Tbilisi.

In June 2017, Lobzhanidze signed a three-year contract with Randers.

On 30 January 2020, Lobzhanidze signed with Turkish club MKE Ankaragücü. He made his debut on 2 February in a 1–1 league draw against Kasımpaşa.

In June 2021, Lobzhanidze signed a three-year contract with Hatayspor, after Ankaragücü had relegated from the Süper Lig.

International career
Lobzhanidze made his debut for the Georgia national football team on 23 January 2017 in a friendly against Uzbekistan, scoring one of the two goals of his team.

International goals
Scores and results list Georgia's goal tally first.

Honours
Dinamo Tbilisi
Georgian League: 2015–16
Georgian Cup: 2014-15, 2015-16
Super Cup: 2015

References

External links
 
 
 

1994 births
Footballers from Tbilisi
Living people
Footballers from Georgia (country)
Georgia (country) international footballers
Association football midfielders
FC Dinamo Tbilisi players
FC Chikhura Sachkhere players
Erovnuli Liga players
Randers FC players
Danish Superliga players
MKE Ankaragücü footballers
Hatayspor footballers
Süper Lig players
Expatriate footballers from Georgia (country)
Expatriate men's footballers in Denmark
Expatriate footballers in Turkey
Expatriate sportspeople from Georgia (country) in Denmark
Expatriate sportspeople from Georgia (country) in Turkey